Christina Stevens (17 November 1825 – 23 May 1876) was a Dutch pedagogue and missionary. She became famous for her work as a missionary teacher of Christianity among the native people of the Dutch East Indies.

References 
 http://resources.huygens.knaw.nl/vrouwenlexicon/lemmata/data/Stevens

1825 births
1876 deaths
19th-century Dutch East Indies people